Thomas "Tom" McCready (19 October 1943 – 19 July 2016) was a Scottish professional footballer who played in the Football League as a left back. He joined Wimbledon from Watford (for whom he made just one appearance). He played over 400 matches for the Dons, scoring 25 goals. McCready left at the end of the 1973/74 season and retired after short spells at Dulwich Hamlet and Staines Town.

McCready was one of many former Wimbledon players who supported the phoenix club AFC Wimbledon, and regularly attended matches. In July 2016 he died after an illness.

References

1943 births
2016 deaths
People from Johnstone
Scottish footballers
Association football defenders
Hibernian F.C. players
Watford F.C. players
Wimbledon F.C. players
Dulwich Hamlet F.C. players
Staines Town F.C. players
English Football League players